The Lavochkin-Gorbunov-Gudkov LaGG-1 was a Soviet fighter aircraft of World War II. Although not very successful, it formed the basis for a series of aircraft that would eventually become some of the most formidable Soviet fighters of the war.

Design and development
It was designed as a light-weight aircraft  around the Klimov M-105 engine and built out of laminated wood to save on strategic materials. The first prototype flew on March 30, 1940, and once some initial difficulties had been worked out of the design, proved to be promising, if somewhat short of what its designers had hoped for. By this stage, however, the need to modernise the Soviet Air Force had been made plain by recent losses in the Winter War with Finland, and the aircraft, initially designated I-22 was ordered into production. Some 100 aircraft were sent to evaluation squadrons, where their shortcomings quickly became obvious. The new fighter proved clearly underpowered. It lacked agility and range. Furthermore, while the prototypes  were carefully handmade and finished, the mass-produced examples were comparatively crude.

The subsequent modifications undertaken by Lavochkin's OKB would result at last in the LaGG-3.

Operators

 Soviet Air Force

Specifications (LaGG-1)

See also

References

Further reading
 Abanshin, Michael E. and Gut, Nina. Fighting Lavochkin, Eagles of the East No.1. Lynnwood, WA: Aviation International, 1993. ISBN unknown.
 Chant, Chris. Aerei della Seconda Guerra Mondiale. Roma, L'Airone, 2008. .
 Gordon, Yefim. Lavochkin's Piston-Engined Fighters (Red Star Volume 10). Earl Shilton, Leicester, UK: Midland Publishing Ltd., 2003. .
 Gordon, Yefim and Khazanov, Dmitri. Soviet Combat Aircraft of the Second World War, Volume One: Single-Engined Fighters. Earl Shilron, Leicester, UK: Midland Publishing Ltd., 1998. .
 Green, William. Warplanes of the Second World War, Volume Three: Fighters. London: Macdonald & Co. (Publishers) Ltd., 1961 (seventh impression 1973). .
 Green, William and Swanborough, Gordon. WW2 Aircraft Fact Files: Soviet Air Force Fighters, Part 1. London: Macdonald and Jane's Publishers Ltd., 1977. .
 Keskinen, Kalevi; Stenman, Kari and Niska, Klaus. Venäläiset Hävittäjät (Suomen Ilmavoimien Historia 7) (in Finnish with English Summary). Espoo, Finland: Tietoteos, 1977. .
 Leonard, Herbert. Encyclopaedia of Soviet Fighters 1939-1951. Paris: Histoire & Collections. 2005. 
 Stapfer, Hans-Heiri. LaGG Fighters in Action (Aircraft in Action Number 163). Carrollton, TX: Squadron/Signal Publications, Inc., 1996. .

Lavochkin aircraft
1930s Soviet fighter aircraft
World War II Soviet fighter aircraft
Low-wing aircraft
Single-engined tractor aircraft
Aircraft first flown in 1940